Ben Andrews may refer to:

 Ben Andrews (actor) (1942–1981), American television actor
 Ben Andrews (mathematician), Australian mathematician